Decaphora is a genus of huntsman spiders that was first described by P. Franganillo B. in 1931.

Species
 it contains five species, found in Central America, Cuba, the Bahamas, Mexico, the United States, and Colombia:
Decaphora cubana (Banks, 1909) (type) – USA, Bahamas, Cuba
Decaphora kohunlich Rheims & Alayón, 2014 – Mexico, Guatemala
Decaphora pestai (Reimoser, 1939) – Belize, Nicaragua, Costa Rica
Decaphora planada Rheims, 2017 – Colombia
Decaphora variabilis (F. O. Pickard-Cambridge, 1900) – Mexico

See also
 List of Sparassidae species

References

Araneomorphae genera
Sparassidae
Spiders of Central America
Spiders of North America